Blowhole Cave is a cave in Utah County, Utah, United States to the west of Utah Lake. The cave is owned by the Utah School and Institutional Trust Lands Administration (SITLA) and is managed by the Timpanogos Grotto of the National Speleological Society. A cave gate was installed April 25–26, 2006. Blowhole cave is very warm (more than ) and moist. Blowhole Cave is the 9th deepest cave in Utah. The most notable formation inside the cave is the Navajo Blanket, a wall composed of brown, tan, red, white, and gray rock.

References

External links
 Blowhole Cave Access Request Form
 Cave Map

Caves of Utah
Tourist attractions in Utah County, Utah
Landforms of Utah County, Utah